Wilnor Joseph (born 15 December 1942) is a Haitian middle-distance runner. He competed in the men's 800 metres at the 1976 Summer Olympics.

References

1942 births
Living people
Athletes (track and field) at the 1976 Summer Olympics
Haitian male middle-distance runners
Olympic athletes of Haiti
Place of birth missing (living people)